On 2 December 1977, a Tupolev Tu-154 passenger jet ran out of fuel and crashed near Benghazi, Libya. A total of 59 passengers were killed.

Aircraft
The aircraft was a Tu-154A registered LZ-BTN and had its first flight in 1974. It was one of six Tu-154s to be leased by Libyan Arab Airlines from Balkan Bulgarian Airlines for that year's pilgrim flights to Mecca for the Hajj.

Accident
The aircraft took off from King Abdulaziz International Airport in Saudi Arabia on a flight to Benina International Airport in the Libyan city of Benghazi with a crew of six and 159 passengers – pilgrims returning to Libya from the Hajj – on board. Egyptian airspace was closed to Libyan aircraft at the time, necessitating an indirect route to Benghazi instead of the direct route across Egypt; the crew reportedly did not plan for the longer flight time, leaving the aircraft short of fuel. As the aircraft neared Benghazi heavy fog blanketed the airport and the crew could not land the aircraft. After failing to locate the alternate airport the aircraft ran out of fuel and crashed during the crew's subsequent attempt to make an emergency landing, killing 59 passengers.

See also
Avianca Flight 52

References

Aviation accidents and incidents in 1977
Aviation accidents and incidents in Libya
Accidents and incidents involving the Tupolev Tu-154
Airliner accidents and incidents caused by fuel exhaustion
Benghazi Libyan Arab Airlines Tu-154 Crash, 1977
History of Benghazi
Libyan Airlines accidents and incidents
December 1977 events in Africa